Andrew Christopher Nardi (born August 18, 1998) is an American professional baseball pitcher for the Miami Marlins of Major League Baseball (MLB).

Amateur career 
Nardi attended Royal High School in Simi Valley, California. 

He originally played college baseball at Ventura College. He was drafted by the New York Yankees in the 39th round of the 2017 Major League Baseball Draft, but did not sign and transferred to Moorpark College. 

He was drafted by the Washington Nationals in the 39th round of the 2018 MLB draft, but again did not sign and transferred to the University of Arizona. 

Nardi signed with the Miami Marlins after they drafted him the 16th round of the 2019 MLB draft.

Professional career
Nardi spent his first professional season with the rookie-level Gulf Coast Marlins and Low-A Batavia Muckdogs, posting a 2-0 record and 0.93 ERA across 14 contests. Nardi did not play in 2020 due to the cancellation of the Minor League Baseball season caused by the COVID-19 pandemic. In 2021, he returned to pitch for the Single-A Jupiter Hammerheads, High-A Beloit Snappers, and Double-A Pensacola Blue Wahoos, logging a 4-3 record and 3.61 ERA with 69 strikeouts in 52.1 innings of work across 29 games. He returned to Pensacola to start the 2022 season before being promoted to the Triple-A Jacksonville Jumbo Shrimp. 

On August 14, 2022, Nardi was selected to the 40-man roster and promoted to the major leagues for the first time alongside Parker Bugg. Nardi made his MLB debut on August 16 against the San Diego Padres. He made 13 appearances for the Marlins, struggling immensely to a 9.82 ERA with 24 strikeouts in 14.2 innings pitched.

References

External links

1998 births
Living people
Arizona Wildcats baseball players
Baseball players from California
Batavia Muckdogs players
Beloit Snappers players
Gulf Coast Marlins players
Jacksonville Jumbo Shrimp players
Jupiter Hammerheads players
Major League Baseball pitchers
Mat-Su Miners players
Miami Marlins players
Moorpark Raiders baseball players
Pensacola Blue Wahoos players
People from West Hills, Los Angeles
Ventura Pirates baseball players